Sondra Gotlieb (née Kaufman; 30 December 1936 in Winnipeg, Manitoba) is a Canadian journalist and novelist who lives in Toronto, Ontario.

She married Allan Gotlieb, Canadian ambassador to the United States during the presidency of Ronald Reagan. Her book Washington Rollercoaster recounted the Gotliebs' years as glamorous hosts in Washington during the Reagan Era, when she wrote a much-read column for the Washington Post. Vanity Fair magazine called her a "sparkling hostess", and in Washington she quickly became known for her irreverent attitude and sharp tongue. She often attracted attention with remarks considered out-of-character for diplomatic wives. Referring to Canada's image in America as a dull northern neighbour, she remarked: "Maybe we should invade South Dakota".

In 1986, she attracted a blaze of international publicity when reporter Juliet O'Neill caught her slapping her social secretary Connie Gibson Connors at an official dinner she and her husband were hosting in honour of the Canadian prime minister Brian Mulroney and U.S. Vice-President George H. W. Bush. The incident, while criticized, made her one of the most talked-about women in Washington, and invitations to the Gotliebs' parties became highly coveted. 

After she and her husband returned to Canada in the early 1990s, they moved to Toronto's exclusive Rosedale neighbourhood and became the centre of establishment society in that city. Allan joined numerous corporate boards, including Conrad Black's Hollinger Inc., while Sondra began writing columns for The Globe and Mail and later the National Post, which was owned by Conrad Black.

She won the Stephen Leacock Prize for her 1978 novel, True Confections, which was subtitled, Or How My Family Arranged My Marriage.

In 2001, she alluded to the infamous "Slap Flap" incident in a series of articles about her recent facelift, published in the National Post. Gotlieb recounted how the idea for cosmetic surgery first came to her after a visit with friends in Washington D.C. "One of them said to me, 'It must be nice living in Toronto. You can slop around without having to bother too much about your appearance. Canadians have such old-fashioned values.' For the second time in my life I felt like slapping someone's face."

Her regular column in the National Post continued until 2015.  

She resides in the Toronto neighbourhood of Rosedale.

Family

Sondra Gotlieb (née Kaufman) and husband Allan were married in 1955. They had three children: Rebecca (1958-2003), Marc (born 1959), and Rachel (born 1962).

Rebecca, a lawyer, was married to Keith Ham, also a lawyer, but they separated and divorced a few years after the adoption of son David in 1992. She subsequently married journalist Matthew Fraser, former Editor-in-Chief of the National Post and television host. In early 2003, she died suddenly after a recurrence of liver cancer.

Marc, an art historian and former University of Toronto professor, is married to Lauren Freeman. They have three children.

Rachel is married to lawyer Rob Dickson and they have two children. They live in the Toronto neighbourhood of Rosedale.

Works

The Gourmet's Canada - 1972
True Confections - 1978
First Lady, Last Lady - 1981
Wife Of... - 1985
Washington Rollercoaster - 1990
Dogs, Houses, Gardens, Food & Other Addictions - 2002
When I Rises Up, I Gets Confused: The Best of Sondra Gotlieb - 2004

References

1936 births
Living people
Canadian columnists
Canadian women novelists
20th-century Canadian novelists
Writers from Winnipeg
Stephen Leacock Award winners
Canadian women journalists
The Globe and Mail columnists
Canadian women columnists
20th-century Canadian women writers
Women humorists
Canadian women non-fiction writers